Lu Ann Homza is an American historian and scholar of the intellectual history of medieval and early modern Europe. She is a professor at the College of William and Mary and the school's Dean for Educational Policy.

Life 
She graduated with a B.A. from Scripps College in 1980 and received an M.A. in 1981 and Ph.D. in 1992 from the University of Chicago. Her main interest is the intellectual history of Spain and Italy from 1400 until 1600 and her main focus of research since 1998 has been the Spanish Inquisition.

Books
Religious Authority in the Spanish Renaissance (Johns Hopkins University Press, 2000)
The Spanish Inquisition, 1478–1614: An Anthology of Sources (edited and translated by Homza; Hackett Press, 2006)

References

21st-century American historians
Historians of Spain
Intellectual historians
College of William & Mary faculty
Scripps College alumni
University of Chicago alumni
Living people
Year of birth missing (living people)
Historians from California